The New International Greek Testament Commentary (or NIGTC) is a series of commentaries in English on the text of the New Testament in Greek. It is published by the William B. Eerdmans Publishing Company. The current series editors are Todd D. Still and Mark Goodacre.

The individual volumes are as follows.

 1,579 pages
 756  pages
 928 pages
 1,140 pages
 1,479 pages
 1,072 pages
 325 pages
 638 pages
 405 pages
 344 pages
 548 pages
 862  pages
 264 pages
 1,309 pages

Reviews
As with all such series by different authors, the quality varies from volume to volume. The reactions vary from "Superb 2 Corinthians commentary" to "Matthew – Every time I looked at this commentary, it seemed as though he was spending more time doing redaction criticism than actually explaining the text".

Other reviewers have different favourite volumes: "Ellingsworth is deep, informative and technical when it comes to the Greek text. That is the strength of this commentary, and for such he is definitely worth owning and consulting." On the 1 Corinthians volume by Thiselton, "A monster of commentary on this great book. It is extremely thorough and deep. It is amazing to think so much information is contained in one book".

See also 

 New International Commentary on the New Testament
 Word Biblical Commentary
 Textual criticism

Notes

Select bibliography 
 Aland, Kurt and others (eds). Novum Testamentum Graece. 27th edition (NA27). Stuttgart: Deutsche Bibelgesellschaft.
 Metzger, Bruce and others (eds). The Greek New Testament. 4th edition (UBS4). New York: United Bible Societies.

External links 
 The New International Greek Testament Commentary — official page of series at publisher's site.

Greek New Testament
Biblical commentaries
New Testament editions